Rebecca's Daughters is a 1992 Welsh and German comedy adventure film about the Rebecca Riots, directed by Karl Francis.

The film was based on a story by Dylan Thomas. The screenplay was originally written in 1948 by Thomas, and was published in book form; 44 years elapsed before it was finally made into a film, which is the longest period of this kind on record. There is some evidence that Thomas' screenplay was derived in part from the riots that occurred in the village of Pontarddulais in south Wales.

Cast
Peter O'Toole as Lord Sarn
Joely Richardson as Rhiannon
Paul Rhys as Anthony Raine
Ray Gravell as Jonah

References

External links

 

1992 films
1990s adventure comedy films
British adventure comedy films
German adventure comedy films
English-language German films
British swashbuckler films
Cross-dressing in film
Films based on works by Dylan Thomas
Films scored by Rachel Portman
Films set in Wales
Films set in the 1830s
Films set in the 1840s
1992 comedy films
German swashbuckler films
1990s English-language films
Films directed by Karl Francis
1990s British films
1990s German films